N.S.S College, Manjeri, is a general degree college located in Manjeri, Malappuram district, Kerala. It was established in 1965. The college is affiliated with Calicut University. The college offers courses in arts, commerce and science.

Departments

Science
Physics
Chemistry
Mathematics
Computer science
Botany
Zoology

Arts and Commerce
Malayalam
English
Arbic
Hindi
Sanskrit
History
Law
Political science
Economics
Physical education
Commerce

Accreditation
The college is  recognized by the University Grants Commission (UGC).

Notable alumni
 Gopinath Muthukad, Magician, Motivational speaker and Philanthropist 
 Anas Edathodika, Footballer 
 Shylan, Writer

See also

References

External links
College's website
University of Calicut
University Grants Commission
National Assessment and Accreditation Council

Universities and colleges in Malappuram district
Educational institutions established in 1965
1965 establishments in Kerala
Arts and Science colleges in Kerala
Colleges affiliated with the University of Calicut
Nair Service Society colleges